Kaburi is a Papuan language of the Bird's Head Peninsula of West Papua.

References

Nuclear South Bird's Head languages